Tunku Abdul Malik ibni Almarhum Sultan Badlishah (24 September 1929 – 29 November 2015) was the heir presumptive to the throne of Kedah. He was the son of Sultan Badlishah and the brother of the late ruler, Sultan Abdul Halim. He served as Regent of Kedah from 1970 to 1975.

Biography
Tunku Abdul Malik was born on 24 September 1929 at Istana Anak Bukit, Anak Bukit, as the second son of Tunku Badlishah and Tunku Sofiah Tunku Mahmud to survive infancy. Tunku Badlishah was the seventh son of Sultan Abdul Hamid Halim (also the father of Tunku Abdul Rahman, first Prime Minister of Malaysia). His father was appointed Raja Muda (Crown Prince) of Kedah in 1935 and became sultan in 1943.

He was educated at Titi Gajah Malay School and Sultan Abdul Hamid College, and attended Wadham College, Oxford.

His elder brother, Tunku Abdul Halim succeeded to the throne in 1958 upon the death of their father. Tunku Abdul Malik became Regent of Kedah from 1970 to 1975 during Sultan Abdul Halim's first reign as Yang di-Pertuan Agong. Because Sultan Abdul Halim has no sons, Tunku Abdul Malik was designated as heir in 1981, and was invested as Raja Muda.

Marriage
Tunku Abdul Malik married Tengku Raudzah binti Almarhum Sultan Hisamuddin (b. 1 September 1929 - d. 21 September 2015), the daughter of Sultan Hisamuddin Alam Shah of Selangor, on 16 July 1957 at Istana Bukit Kota, Alor Setar. After his appointment as Raja Muda in 1981, Tengku Raudzah became the Raja Puan Muda. They had been married for 58 years until Tengku Raudzah's death in September 2015. He outlived both his wife and his eldest sister, Tunku Hamidah (b. 1924, who died the same year at the age of 91) by two months.

Death
Tunku Abdul Malik died at 1:00 am, 29 November 2015, age of 86 at Sultanah Bahiyah Hospital, Alor Star due to old age. His body was laid to rest at Kedah Royal Mausoleum in  Langgar.

Honours 

He has been awarded the following decorations:

Honours of Kedah 
  Member of the Royal Family Order of Kedah (DK) (21.2.1968), 
  Member of the Halimi Family Order of Kedah (DKH) (22.2.1976), 
  Member of the Supreme Order of Sri Mahawangsa (DMK) (12.12.2011)
  Knight Grand Commander of the Exalted Order of the Crown of Kedah (SPMK) – Dato' Seri (29.2.1964)
  Sultan Badlishah Medal for Faithful and Loyal Service (PSB)

Honours of Malaysia 
  : 
  Knight Grand Commander of the Order of the Crown of Johor (SPMJ) – Dato
 Sultan Ismail Coronation Medal of Johor (1960)
  : 
  Grand Knight of the Order of Cura Si Manja Kini ( SPCM) – Dato' Seri
  : 
  Second Class of the Royal Family Order of Selangor (DK II) (20.7.1989)
  : 
  Member first class of the Family Order of Terengganu (DK I)
  : 
  Knight Commander of the Order of the Star of Hornbill Sarawak (DA) – Datuk Amar

Ancestry

Footnotes

References

1929 births
2015 deaths
Malaysian people of Malay descent
Malaysian people of Thai descent
Malaysian Muslims
Abdul Malik
People from Kedah
Sons of monarchs

Members of the Royal Family Order of Kedah
Members of the Halimi Family Order of Kedah
Members of the Supreme Order of Sri Mahawangsa
Knights Grand Commander of the Exalted Order of the Crown of Kedah

Second Classes of Royal Family Order of Selangor
Knights Grand Commander of the Order of the Crown of Johor
First Classes of the Family Order of Terengganu
Knights Commander of the Order of the Star of Hornbill Sarawak
Non-inheriting heirs presumptive